Lloyd Stearman Field , also known as Benton Airpark, is a public airport located one mile (1.6 km) southwest of the central business district of Benton, in Butler County, Kansas, United States. The airport covers 30 acres and has one runway. It was named in honor of aviation pioneer Lloyd Stearman and seven Stearman World War II-era training biplanes are based there.

The airfield was used for several scenes from the 1969 movie The Gypsy Moths.

Services 
In early 2010, a restaurant, Stearman Field Bar & Grill, opened on the airport property. It serves typical cafe food, such as breakfast, hamburgers, and steaks, as well as a full bar.

Fueling options include Jet-A with Prist via fuel truck, and a self-serve 100LL pump is located in the main parking apron. Ground Power Units are available.

King Air 90B charter services are available. Beechjet shares are also offered.

Flight training is available at Prairie Air Service, located midfield. Tie-downs and hangars are also available, but are not plentiful. A crew car is available.

Nearby airports

Other airports in Wichita
 Wichita Mid-Continent Airport
 Colonel James Jabara Airport
 Beech Factory Airport
 Cessna Aircraft Field
 McConnell Air Force Base
 Westport Airport

Other nearby airports
 El Dorado / Captain Jack Thomas Airport
 Augusta Municipal Airport
Other airports in region
 List of airports in Kansas
 List of airports in Oklahoma

References 
Airport Master Record (FAA Form 5010), also available as a printable form (PDF)
Benton Airpark - Lloyd Stearman Field (official website)

External links 
  - airport diagram and aerial photo
Prairie Air Service, Inc. - flight school located at Benton Airpark

Airports in Kansas
Buildings and structures in Butler County, Kansas